Scoop, Scoops or The scoop may refer to:

Objects
 Scoop (tool), a shovel-like tool, particularly one deep and curved, used in digging
 Scoop (machine part), a component of machinery to carry things
 Scoop stretcher, a device used for casualty lifting
 Scoop (utensil), a specialized spoon for serving
 Hood scoop, a ventilating opening in the bonnet (hood) of a car
 Scoop (theater), a type of wide area lighting fixture
 Scoop neckline, a kind of shirt neckline

Characters
 Scoop (G.I. Joe), a character in the G.I. Joe universe
 Scoop, a toy bulldozer in Scoop and Doozie 
 Todd "Scoops" Ming, a character on WordGirl
 Scoop, a backhoe loader character in Bob the Builder

Film and television
 The Scoop (film), a 1934 British crime film
 Scoop (1987 film), a film based on novel by Evelyn Waugh
 Scoop (2006 film), a film by Woody Allen
 Scoop (upcoming film), a Netflix film scheduled for release in 2024
 Scoop!, a 2016 Japanese film
 Scoop, a Malaysian film by Aziz M. Osman
 Scoop (TV series), a children's series on CBBC

Magazines and journalism
 Scoop (news), a news story, normally an exclusive for a journalist 
 Scoop (website), a news website based in New Zealand
 Scoop (journalism magazine), a quarterly publication by the Australian Journalists Association
 Scoops (magazine), a 1934 UK science fiction magazine

Technology
 SCOOP (software), the Simple Concurrent Object-Oriented Programming extension for concurrent programming in the Eiffel programming language
 Python SCOOP (software), a Python framework for scalable concurrent operations
 LG Scoop, a phone
 Scoop Package Manager, a command-line installer for Windows

Video games
 The Scoop (video game), a 1986 video game for the Apple II
 Scoops — Ice Cream Fun for Everyone, an IOS game developed by NimbleBit LLC

Other uses
 Sixties Scoop
 Scoop (album), a 1983 album by Pete Townshend
 Scoop (cricket), a modern shot in cricket which involves reversing the grip on the bat
 Scoop (dance project), a Belgian dance project by Jan Vervloet
 Scoop (music), a type of glissando performed by wind instruments
 Scoop (nickname), a list of people nicknamed "Scoop" or "Scoops"
 Scoop (novel), a 1938 satirical novel by Evelyn Waugh
 The Scoop, an outdoor amphitheatre in London
 Scoop Lake, Idaho, an alpine lake
 Scoop, a professional wrestling hold
 "Scoop", a song by Lil Nas X from Montero (2021)

See also
 Fatman Scoop (born 1979), American rapper
 Operation Primicia or Operation Scoop, a guerrilla attack on October 5, 1975, in Formosa, Argentina
 Scoop Smith, a character in Fawcett Comics' Whiz Comics